The Royal Netherlands Navy is the naval force of the Kingdom of the Netherlands.

During the 17th century, the navy of the Dutch Republic (1581–1795) was one of the most powerful naval forces in the world and played an active role in the Anglo-Dutch Wars, the Franco-Dutch War, and wars against Spain and several other European powers. The Batavian Navy of the later Batavian Republic (1795–1806) and Kingdom of Holland (1806–1810) played an active role in the Napoleonic Wars, though mostly dominated by French interests.

After the establishment of the modern Kingdom of the Netherlands, it served an important role in protecting Dutch colonial rule, especially in Southeast Asia, and would play a minor role in World War II, especially against the Imperial Japanese Navy. Since World War II, the Royal Netherlands Navy has taken part in expeditionary peacekeeping operations.

Bases
The main naval base is in Den Helder, North Holland. Secondary naval bases are in Amsterdam, Vlissingen and Willemstad (Curaçao). Netherlands Marine Corps barracks are in Rotterdam, Doorn, Suffisant on Curaçao, and Savaneta on Aruba.

Officer training
Officers of the Nederland Navy are trained at the Royal Naval Institute, which is part of the Netherlands defence academy in Den Helder.
Around 100–120 people start training every year.

Ship prefixes

An international prefix for ships of the Royal Netherlands Navy is HNLMS (His/Her Netherlands Majesty's Ship).  The Netherlands navy itself uses the prefixes Zr.Ms. when a king is on the throne, and Hr.Ms. when there is a queen. This happens automatically at the moment the previous monarch ceases to reign.

History

The modern Netherlands Navy dates its founding to a "statute of admiralty" issued by Maximilian, King of the Romans and his son Philip the Fair, the ruler of Burgundian lands (a minor at that time) on 8 January 1488. This is also the date accepted by Wragg. Richard Ernest Dupuy and Trevor Nevitt Dupuy consider this as the founding date of the administrative foundations of the Dutch navy. Sicking opines that the 1488 Ordinance marked a departure point from previous policies by establishing a centralized structure, although the objectives of the Ordinance initially could not be carried out because of strong opposition and unfavourable political climate (for example, the first central Admiral, Philip of Cleves, sided with the rebels against Maximilian since 1488). The situation improved with the appointment of Philip of Burgundy-Beveren in 1491, and especially since the tenures of Adolf and Maximilian of Burgundy. A true permanent central navy only emerged after the 1550-1555 period, under the governorship of Mary of Hungary, with Cornelis de Schepper also playing a major role.

Jaap R. Bruijn traces the origins of an independent Dutch navy to the early stages of the Eighty Years' War (1568–1648) while the formation of a "national" navy is dated to the establishment of the Dutch Republic in 1597.

Netherlands Golden Age

The Netherlands navy was involved in several wars against other European powers from the late 16th century, initially for independence against Spain in European waters, later for shipping lanes, trade and colonies in many parts of the world, notably in four Anglo-Dutch wars against England. During the 17th century the Dutch navy was one of the most powerful navies in the world. As an organization, the navy of the Dutch Republic consisted of five separate admiralties (three of them in Holland, and one each in Friesland and Zeeland), each with its own ships, personnel, shipyards, command structures and revenues.

World War II

At the start of WW2 the Dutch had five cruisers, eight destroyers, 24 submarines, and smaller vessels, along with 50 aircraft. The Netherlands was conquered in 1940 by Nazi Germany in a matter of days, and two Dutch light cruisers and one destroyer leader and three destroyers that were under construction were captured in their shipyard.

For the rest of the war, the Dutch navy was based in Allied countries: the Dutch navy had its headquarters in London, and smaller units in Ceylon (modern day Sri Lanka) and Western Australia. Around the world Dutch naval units were responsible for transporting troops, for example during Operation Dynamo at Dunkirk and on D-Day, they escorted convoys and attacked enemy targets.

A small force of submarines based in Western Australia sank more Japanese ships in the first weeks after Japan joined the war than the entire British and American navies together during the same period, an exploit which earned Admiral Helfrich the nickname "Ship-a-day Helfrich". The aggressive pace of operations against the Japanese was a contributing factor to both the heavy losses sustained and the greater number of successes scored as compared to the British and Americans in the region.

But during the relentless Japanese offensive of February through April 1942 in the Dutch East Indies, the Dutch navy in Asia was virtually annihilated, particularly in the Battle of the Java Sea (27 February 1942) in which the commander, Karel Doorman, went down with his fleet along with 1,000 sailors. The Navy sustained losses of a total of 20 ships (including two of its three light cruisers) and 2,500 sailors killed in the course of the campaign. The Dutch navy had suffered from years of underfunding and came ill-prepared to face an enemy with more and heavier ships with better weapons, including the Long Lance-torpedo, with which the cruiser  sank the light cruiser .

Netherlands New Guinea

After the war, the relations between the Netherlands and its colonies changed dramatically. The establishment of the Republic of Indonesia, two days after the Japanese surrender, thwarted the Dutch plans for restoring colonial authority. After four years of war the Netherlands acknowledged the independence of Indonesia.

Part of the Dutch Navy was next stationed in Netherlands New Guinea until that, too, was turned over to the Indonesian government in 1962. This followed a campaign of infiltrations by the Indonesian National Armed Forces, supported by modern equipment from the Soviet Union, that was nevertheless successfully repulsed by the Dutch navy. These infiltrations took place after the order of President Sukarno to integrate the territory as an Indonesian province.

NATO cooperation

With the creation of the North Atlantic Treaty Organization, the military focus was on the army and air force; it was not until the Korean War (1950–53) that the navy got more recognition. The government allowed the creation of a balanced fleet consisting of two naval squadrons. Apart from the aircraft carrier  the Dutch navy consisted of two light cruisers (two ), 12 destroyers (four , eight ), eight submarines, six frigates (s), and a considerable number of minesweepers.

As a member of NATO, the Netherlands developed its security policy in close cooperation with other members. The establishment of the Warsaw pact in 1955 intensified the arms race between West and East. Technical innovations rapidly emerged, the introduction of radar and sonar were followed by nuclear weapon systems and long-range missiles. The geopolitical situation allowed for a fixed military strategy. Beginning in 1965, the Dutch Navy joined certain permanent NATO squadrons like the Standing Naval Force Atlantic.

Structure 

The constituent parts of the Royal Netherlands Navy are:

Naval squadron
Contains all surface combatants, replenishment ships, and amphibious support ships.

Submarine service 

Houses the submarines and a support vessel.

Mine Detection and Clearing Service 
Contains various minehunters.

Hydrographic Survey 
The Dienst der Hydrografie (Hydrographic Service) is responsible for relevant hydrographic surveys.

Naval aviation 
Two squadrons equipped with NH90 helicopter based at De Kooy Airfield.

Netherlands Marine Corps 

 Two Marine Combat Groups (1 MCG and 2 MCG)
 One Maritime Special Operations Force  (NLMARSOF)
 One Surface Assault and Training Group (SATG)
 One Seabased Support Group (SSG)
 32 Raiding Squadron (permanently stationed at Aruba)
 Rotterdam Marine Band of the Royal Netherlands Navy

Netherlands & Dutch Caribbean Coastguard 
Although the Netherlands Coastguard is not an official part of the Navy, it is under its operational control. Also the Dutch Caribbean Coast Guard is under the operational control of the Navy and is commanded by the commander of the Navy in the Caribbean.

Coastguard Aircraft

Equipment

Ships 

The Royal Netherlands Navy currently operates 7 main classes of vessels:
Note: in the Royal Netherlands Navy frigates are interchangeable with destroyers as there is no separate class

* The Royal Netherlands Navy classifies the De Zeven Provinciën-class as frigates, but internationally they are most comparable to destroyers (due to their size and weapon capability) platform for Sea Based Anti-Ballistic Missile defence

Naval aviation – maritime helicopters 

 19 NH90, 11 NATO Frigate Helicopter (NFH) and eight transport version of the NATO Frigate Helicopter (TNFH) for Marine Corps Air Lift Helicopter Squadron. One NFH was lost on 19 July 2020 as result of a crash in the Caribbean Sea near the island of Aruba, killing two of the four crew on board.

Since the retirement of the Westland Lynx, the Royal Netherlands Air Force fills the gap of the Lynx's amphibious task with Airbus AS-532U2 Cougar helicopters.  The Cougar's main task is to support the Royal Netherlands Marine Corps on board of the LPD's and JSS. Other tasks are to provide Medical air transport to and from these ships, but also support SOF units in amphibious missions and trainings.

In 2012 an Apache attack helicopter from the Royal Netherlands Air Force made a deck landing on board  for the first time as part of an initial study into the possibilities for wider use of the helicopters as these will be upgraded to the AH-64E standard which has specific features for maritime operations.

The Dutch amphibious support ship  and the HNLMS Karel Doorman JSS are designed to handle Royal Netherlands Air Force CH-47F Chinook helicopters but still require additional anti corrosion measures (part of the ongoing upgrade of the CH-47F).

Autonomous underwater vehicles
 REMUS 100 autonomous underwater vehicle

Vehicles

Weaponry

Inventory
In 2022 the fleet of the Royal Netherlands Navy consists of these ships:

The total tonnage will be approx. 140,000 tonnes. Next to these ships a lot of other smaller vessels remain in the navy.

With these changes the Royal Netherlands Navy will have 10 large oceangoing vessels ranging from medium/low to high combat action ships. The renewed Dutch Navy will be a green-water navy, having enough frigates and auxiliaries to operate far out at sea, while depending on land-based air support, and, with the large amphibious squadron, they will have significant brown-water navy capabilities.

Future changes

In April 2018, the Dutch Government approved a multi-year investment program and allocated funds for the 2018–2030 period, including;
 The s replacement with new boats planned for initial service entry in 2034. The subs are currently undergoing a Service-life Extension Program (SLEP), including new sonar, new optronic periscope and weapon upgrades for near shore operations. The Royal Dutch Navy is evaluating Saab/Damen (A-26), TKMS (Upgraded 212), Navantia S-80 and a Naval Group (SSK version of Barracuda) proposal. In 2019 the S-80 option was dropped, originally with plans to place an order for the winning design in 2022 and having the first boat in service in 2028 and the first two by 2031. However, in October 2021 it was reported that this timeline was no longer feasible. Instead, the Dutch Ministry of Defence signalled that the envisaged dates would have to be "substantially adjusted". In April 2022 it was announced that the revised schedule for the construction of the new replacement boats would likely see the first two replacement vessels entering service in the 2034 to 2037 timeframe.
 Upgrading the De Zeven Provinciën-class LCF frigates Theatre Ballistic Missile Defense, acquisition of RIM-161 Standard Missile 3 (SM-3), a new OtoMelara 127/64 LW canon, ESSM-2 and SLCM BGM-109 Tomahawk and expanding the Mk41 VLS with an additional 8 cell unit.
 Replacement of the Karel Doorman-class M frigates in the 2028/2030 period by 2 ships(plus another 2 for the Belgian Navy), designed & built by Damen Shipyards. See Future Surface Combatant for more information.
 Replacement of the 6 Alkmaar-class MCM ships from 2025 including MCM Drones. 6 units each will be built for both the Belgian and Dutch navies for a total of 12 ships. The contract was won by Naval Group on 15 March 2019 for the construction of 12 City-class mine countermeasures vessels.
 Increasing the size of the Royal Netherlands Marine Corps to remain highly integrated with the British Royal Marines. In 2017 the Ministry of Defence announced the formation of a Fleet Marine Squadron for the protection of merchant ships.
 The German Navy Seebatallion (Marines) will be integrated into the Royal Netherlands Marine Corps.
 Cooperation with the German Navy regarding Submarine & Amphibious Operations.
 Acquisition of a new Combat Support Ship to replace the former Zr.Ms. Amsterdam, designed & build by Damen Shipyards. This ship will be based on the JSS Karel Doorman design to improve type commonality (architecture & components) and is expected to be delivered in 2024. The ship will be named Zr.Ms. Den Helder after the city of Den Helder, with the pennant A834. First steel was cut in December 2020 and the ship was launched in October 2022.
 Replacement of Zr.Ms. Mercuur, Zr.Ms. Pelikaan, the four diving support vessels, the diving training vessel Zr.MS. Soemba, the hydographic vessels Zr.Ms. Snellius en Zr.Ms. Luymes and the training vessel Van Kinsbergen from 2024 onwards.
 Acquisition of new LCU's in 2025 with additional capacity to support amphibious operations and the integration of the German Navy Marines (Seebatallion).
 Main Naval Ship Based Weapons will be replaced by acquiring ESSM-2, new 127mm canons, Harpoon ASuW replacement, SM-3, SM-2 IIIC SAM, Goalkeeper CIWS replacement, MK 46 & MK 48 Torpedo replacement and SLCM.

Theater ballistic missile defense 
Together with the United States and several other NATO members, the Dutch Navy is testing and updating its ships for Tactical ballistic missile defense capability. Although tests conducted concerning the capability of the APAR (Active Phased Array Radar) have been very successful, in 2018 the Dutch Government approved plans to acquire the SM-3 missiles for integration into the existing weapon suite of the LCF frigates. The four LCF ships will be fitted out with eight SM-3 missiles each (they are provisioned for this VLS extension) through Foreign Military Sales (under discussion between the US and The Netherlands).

Historic ships 
 several ships by the name of 
 several ships by the name of 
 , 18th century fourth rate ship of the line
 , 17th century ship of the line and flagship of Michiel de Ruyter
 , the navy's largest warship in the 19th century
 , ironclad from the 1860s

Surviving historic ships
 
 
 
 HNLMS Onverschrokken
 HNLMS Abraham Crijnssen

By period

Ranks and insignia

Officers

Enlisted ranks

See also 
 Francien de Zeeuw
 Netherlands Naval Aviation Service
 Military history of the Netherlands
 Military ranks of the Dutch armed forces
 Royal Netherlands Navy Submarine Service
 Ships of the Royal Netherlands Navy

Notes

References

External links 

 
Netherlands Armed Forces
1488 establishments in Europe
Articles containing video clips
Organisations based in the Netherlands with royal patronage